James Alexander Peak (11 November 1916 – 8 November 1997) was an Australian rules footballer who played with St Kilda in the Victorian Football League (VFL).

Peak was the first St Kilda player to win a Gardiner Medal, taking home the seconds best and fairest award in 1937. He was rewarded with senior selection in 1938 but wasn't retained by St Kilda for the 1939 VFL season.
 
He later served St Kilda as a committeeman. As a selector, he helped build the team which could break the club's premiership drought in 1966.

References

1916 births
St Kilda Football Club players
Australian rules footballers from Melbourne
1997 deaths